"Learning to Live Again" is a song written by Don Schlitz and Stephanie Davis, and recorded by American country music singer Garth Brooks. It was released in January 1993 as the third single from his album, The Chase and his sixteenth overall. This song peaked at number 2 on the U.S. Hot Country Singles & Tracks (now Hot Country Songs) chart, and reached number 5 on Canada's RPM country chart. This song is included on The Ultimate Hits collection.

Content
The song is a ballad, in which the narrator, a widower, describes his feelings of loneliness and isolation while expressing doubt about his capability to 'live again', date again and move past his mourning for his late wife. His friends then set him up on a double date at a little cafe. He feels very out of place but is getting along with his date. She asks him to dance but he's forgotten her name. The chorus describes how learning to live again as a single man is killing him. When they are saying goodnight on her porch, he kisses her on the cheek and gets the courage to ask if he can see her again. It is revealed that she is learning to live again also, but he doesn't know it. She says, "We'll See".

Chart positions
"Learning to Live Again" debuted at number 48 on the U.S. Billboard Hot Country Singles & Tracks for the week of February 6, 1993.

Year-end charts

References

1993 singles
Garth Brooks songs
Songs written by Don Schlitz
Song recordings produced by Allen Reynolds
Liberty Records singles
Songs written by Stephanie Davis (singer)
1992 songs